David Franklin Manning (May 1, 1857 - January 18, 1929) was a justice of the New York Supreme Court. He was president of the Brooklyn Bar Association and vice president of the New York State Bar Association.

Biography
He was born on May 1, 1857, or May 2, 1857, in Clonmel in Ireland to Peter F. Manning. He emigrated to the United States in 1867. He married Mary G. M. in 1879. They had two sons.

He attended law school and practiced law in Brooklyn. In October 1912 he was elected as a justice for the New York Supreme Court. In 1921 he was moved to the Appellate Division of the New York Supreme Court, Second Judicial Department by governor Nathan Lewis Miller. He retired from the bench in 1927 when he reached the mandatory retirement age of 70.

He died in Brooklyn, New York City on January 18, 1929.

References

1857 births
1929 deaths
New York Supreme Court Justices
Irish emigrants to the United States (before 1923)